The Aréna Glencore (previously known as the Aréna Iamgold and the Aréna Dave-Keon) is a 2,150-seat (total capacity 3,500) multi-purpose arena in Rouyn-Noranda, Quebec, Canada. It was built in 1951. It is home to the Rouyn-Noranda Huskies ice hockey team. Formerly named in honour of Dave Keon, a member of the Hockey Hall of Fame and a native of the city, Toronto-based international gold producer Iamgold would later buy the naming rights.

Past events
In the past, the arena has hosted: 
2008 - President's Cup (QMJHL) Final Vs Gatineau Olympiques
2016 - President's Cup (QMJHL) Final Vs Shawinigan Cataractes
2019 - President's Cup (QMJHL) Final Vs Halifax Mooseheads

Indoor ice hockey venues in Quebec
Indoor arenas in Quebec
Sports venues in Quebec
Quebec Major Junior Hockey League arenas
Sport in Rouyn-Noranda
Buildings and structures in Abitibi-Témiscamingue